Uldurga (Ülderge) is a rural locality (a selo) and the administrative centre of Uldurginskoye Rural Settlement, Yeravninsky District, Republic of Buryatia, Russia. The population was 1,231 as of 2017. There are 23 streets.

Geography 
Uldurga is located 88 km southwest of Sosnovo-Ozerskoye (the district's administrative centre) by road. Tuzhinka is the nearest rural locality.

References 

Rural localities in Yeravninsky District